Citharomangelia denticulata is a species of sea snail, a marine gastropod mollusk in the family Mangeliidae.

Description
The length of the shell attains 9.5 mm, its diameter 2.5 mm.

This is a narrow, elongated species. It contains 9 (?) whorls (the protoconch has been lost). The 6 remaining whorls are convex and a show a faint indication of spiral striation. It contains 12 axial ribs on the penultimate whorl. The aperture is narrow and long. It measures about half of the total length of the shell. The outer lip shows 9 small denticles and is slightly sinuate at the top. The columella has only faint indication of denticles. The siphonal canal is short. The color of the shell is white with brown bands in the sutures.

Distribution
This marine species occurs in the Indian Ocean off Mauritius.

References

External links
  Tucker, J.K. 2004 Catalog of recent and fossil turrids (Mollusca: Gastropoda). Zootaxa 682:1–1295.
 
 Kilburn R.N. 1992. Turridae (Mollusca: Gastropoda) of southern Africa and Mozambique. Part 6. Subfamily Mangeliinae, section 1. Annals of the Natal Museum, 33: 461–575

denticulata
Gastropods described in 1884